Chemokine (C-C motif) ligand 3 (CCL3) also known as macrophage inflammatory protein 1-alpha (MIP-1-alpha) is a protein that in humans is encoded by the CCL3 gene.

Function 

CCL3 is a cytokine belonging to the CC chemokine family that is involved in the acute inflammatory state in the recruitment and activation of polymorphonuclear leukocytes through binding to the receptors CCR1, CCR4 and CCR5.

Sherry et al. (1988) demonstrated 2 protein components of MIP1, called by them alpha (CCL3, this protein) and beta (CCL4).

CCL3 produces a monophasic fever of rapid onset whose magnitude is equal to or greater than that of fevers produced with either recombinant human tumor necrosis factor or recombinant human interleukin-1. However, in contrast to these two endogenous pyrogens, the fever induced by MIP-1 is not inhibited by the cyclooxygenase inhibitor ibuprofen and CCL3 may participate in the febrile response that is not mediated through prostaglandin synthesis and clinically cannot be ablated by cyclooxygenase.

Interactions 

CCL3 has been shown to interact with CCL4.
Attracts macrophages, monocytes and neutrophils.

See also 
Macrophage inflammatory proteins

References

External links

Further reading 

 
 
 
 
 
 

Cytokines